Lanzelin (c. 940-981/991) was a Germanic noble and was a distant ancestor of the House of Habsburg. His father, Guntram the Rich, was a powerful nobleman. He married Liutgarda of Nellenburg (daughter of Eberhart III of Thurgau) from whom he inherited part of his possessions in present-day Switzerland, whilst from his father he inherited the titles of Duke of Muri and Count of Sundgau. He also possessed the titles of Duke of Altenburg and Count of Klettgau, and had lands in Alsace.

An alternate theory on Lanzelin's ancestry suggests that he was only adopted by Guntram, whilst actually being directly descended from the Carolingians or the Alaholfings.

Several male children were born to him, amongst which are:

 Lanzelin II or Lanzelin the Younger († 1027), who was Count of Reichenau, as well as a possible predecessor of the House of Zähringen.
 Werner († 1028), Bishop of Strasbourg.
 Radbot († 1045), Count of Klettgau and builder of Habsburg Castle. He was the ancestor of what would become the House of Habsburg.
 Rudolf I († 1064), Count of Habsburg.

He also had a daughter, Ita von Habsburg.

References 

10th-century German nobility

940 births
10th-century deaths
Year of birth uncertain
Year of death uncertain